The double contrabass flute (also octobass flute; subcontrabass flute) is the largest and lowest pitched metal flute, with  of tubing (the hyperbass flute, an octave lower, is made from PVC and wood). It is pitched in the key of C, three octaves below the regular flute (two octaves below the bass, and one octave below the contrabass).Its lowest note is C1, one octave below the cello's lowest C and the lowest C on the piano. This flute is relatively easy to play in comparison to most other large flutes. Despite the tendency of the larger sizes of flute to be softer than their higher pitched relatives, the double contrabass flute has a relatively powerful tone, although it usually benefits from amplification in ensembles.

The Japanese firm of Kotato & Fukushima sell their double contrabass flutes for US$48,000.
Their main use has been in large flute choirs and occasionally in film scores.

PVC version

A double contrabass flute constructed of PVC, called a subcontrabass flute by its creator, the Dutch instrument maker Jelle Hogenhuis, has the tubing in a notably different arrangement from its metal counterpart.
Although the PVC instrument was designed to be an ensemble instrument, it has also been picked up by solo artists.

References

External links

Listening
MP3 of Jelle Hogenhuis subcontrabass flute

Side-blown flutes
Contrabass instruments